The 1978 Giro d'Italia was the 61st edition of the Giro d'Italia, one of cycling's Grand Tours. The Giro began with a prologue individual time trial in Saint-Vincent on 7 May, and Stage 11a occurred on 18 May with a flat stage from Terni. The race finished in Milan on 28 May.

Stage 11a
18 May 1978 — Terni to Assisi,

Stage 11b
18 May 1978 — Assisi to Siena,

Stage 12
19 May 1978 — Poggibonsi to Monte Trebbio,

Stage 13
20 May 1978 — Modigliana to Padua,

Stage 14
21 May 1978 — Venezia to Venezia,  (ITT)

Rest day
22 May 1978

Stage 15
23 May 1978 — Treviso to Canazei,

Stage 16
24 May 1978 — Mazzin to Cavalese,  (ITT)

Stage 17
25 May 1978 — Cavalese to Monte Bondone,

Stage 18
26 May 1978 — Mezzolombardo to Sarezzo,

Stage 19
27 May 1978 — Brescia to Inverigo,

Stage 20
28 May 1978 — Inverigo to Milan,

References

1978 Giro d'Italia
Giro d'Italia stages